The fourth election to the Carmarthen Rural District Council was held in March 1904. It was preceded by the 1901 election and followed by the 1907 election. The successful candidates were also elected to the Carmarthen Board of Guardians.

There were a number of unopposed returns in the rural parishes.

Ward Results

Abergwili (two seats)

Abernant (one seat)

Conwil (two seats)

Laugharne Parish (one seat)

Laugharne Township (one seat)

Llanarthney (two seats)

Llandawke and Llansadurnen (one seat)

Llanddarog (one seat)

Llandeilo Abercowyn and Llangynog (one seat)

Llanddowror (one seat)

Llandyfaelog (one seat)

Llanfihangel Abercowin (one seat)
David Thomas, the member since 1894, submitted a nomination but then withdrew.

Llangain (one seat)

Llangendeirne (two seats)

Llangunnor (one seat)

Llangynin (one seat)

Llanllawddog (one seat)

Llanpumsaint (one seat)

Llanstephan (one seat)

Llanwinio (one seat)

Merthyr (one seat)

Mydrim (one seat)

Newchurch (one seat)

St Clears (one seat)

St Ishmaels (one seat)

Trelech a'r Betws (two seats)
The vicar of Trelech, Rev William Henry Jones, a member of the previous council, submitted a nomination but withdrew.

Carmarthen Board of Guardians

All members of the District Council also served as members of Carmarthen Board of Guardians. In addition six members were elected to represent the borough of Carmarthen.

For the first time since 1894 there was a contested election and although the election was fought on denominational rather than party political lines, the two church candidates were also supported by the Conservative Association. At the recent county council election there had been a close contest between Fuller-Mills and David Davies.

Carmarthen (six seats)

References

1904 Welsh local elections
Elections in Carmarthenshire
20th century in Carmarthenshire